Paul Toomey is a retired American soccer defender who played professionally in the North American Soccer League, American Soccer League and the Major Indoor Soccer League.

Toomey graduated from Coventry High School.  He attended the University of Pennsylvania where he was a 1976 Honorable Mention (third team) and 1977 Second Team All-American soccer player.  In 1978, the Portland Timbers selected Toomey in the first round of the North American Soccer League draft.  He played eight games for the Timbers in 1979.  In the fall of 1979, he signed with the Hartford Hellions of the Major Indoor Soccer League.  He would play two indoor winter seasons with the Hellions.  In 1980, the Hellions loaned Toomey to the San Jose Earthquakes for the 1980 NASL season.  In 1981, he played for the New England Sharks of the American Soccer League.  In the fall of 1981, he joined the Pittsburgh Spirit of MISL.  In the summer of 1983, he had knee surgery.  Complications from the surgery limited him to twelve games with the Spirit during the 1983–1984 season and his eventual retirement.

References

External links
NASL/MISL stats

1956 births
Living people
Sportspeople from New London, Connecticut
Soccer players from Connecticut
American soccer players
American Soccer League (1933–1983) players
Hartford Hellions players
Major Indoor Soccer League (1978–1992) players
New England Sharks players
North American Soccer League (1968–1984) players
Penn Quakers men's soccer players
Pittsburgh Spirit players
Portland Timbers (1975–1982) players
San Jose Earthquakes (1974–1988) players
Association football defenders